The National Park System preserves the history and contributions of African Americans as part of the nation's history. Over the years, the staff of the National Park Service has reflected the nation's social history.  Among the first African Americans who influenced the course of the National Parks were:

 Early Superintendents (not fully inclusive)
 Charles Young:  He served as an early Superintendent of Sequoia National Park in 1903.  As a Captain in the 9th Cavalry Regiment, he was directed to take two troops of Buffalo soldiers to the Giants Grove of Sequoia and protect the trees and the park from damage.  While there, the two companies completed construction of a road to the Giant's Grove, making public access possible.
 Robert Stanton, National Capital Parks (East) (1970–1971)
 Georgia Ellard, Rock Creek Park (1977–1988)
 Garry Traynham, Allegheny Portage (1990–1995)
 Deputy Directors
 Donald Murphy, (2002–2005)
 Director
 Robert Stanton, (1997–2001)

Parks
African Burial Ground National Monument, New York, NY
Arlington House, The Robert E. Lee Memorial, Arlington, VA
Booker T. Washington National Monument, Hardy, VA
Boston African American National Historic Site, Boston, MA
Brown v. Board of Education National Historic Site, Topeka, KS
Cane River Creole National Historical Park, Natchez, LA
Colonial National Historical Park, Yorktown, VA (Jamestown African Americans)
Dayton Aviation Heritage National Historical Park, Dayton, OH (Paul L. Dunbar House)
Frederick Douglass National Historic Site, Washington, D.C.
Fort Davis National Historic Site, Fort Davis, TX (Buffalo Soldiers)
Fort Scott National Historic Site, Fort Scott, KS (Kansas 1st Colored Dragoons)
Fort Smith National Historic Site, Fort Smith, AR (from slavery to Parker's Court)
Gateway Arch National Park, St. Louis, MO (Black Frontiersman)
George Washington Birthplace National Monument, Washington's Birthplace, VA (Washington's Slaves, Indentured Servants, & Free Blacks)
George Washington Carver National Monument, Diamond, MO
Guadalupe Mountains National Park, Salt Flat, TX (Buffalo Soldiers)
Harpers Ferry National Historical Park, Harpers Ferry, WV (Frederick Douglass Visit)
Hopewell Furnace National Historic Site, Hopewell, PA (African Americans)
Jean Lafitte National Historical Park and Preserve, New Orleans, LA
Lincoln Home National Historic Site, Springfield, IL
Lincoln Memorial, Washington, D.C.
Little Rock Central High School, Little Rock, AR
Maggie L. Walker National Historic Site, Richmond, VA
Martin Luther King, Jr. National Historic Site, Atlanta, GA
Martin Luther King Jr. Memorial, Washington, D.C.
Mary McLeod Bethune Council House National Historic Site, Washington, D.C.
New Orleans Jazz National Historical Park, New Orleans, LA
Nicodemus National Historic Site, Nicodemus, KS
Perry's Victory and International Peace Memorial, Put-in-Bay, OH (Black Sailors)
Petersburg National Battlefield, Petersburg, VA
Port Chicago Naval Magazine National Memorial, Concord NWS, Concord, CA
Richmond National Battlefield Park, Richmond, VA
San Francisco Maritime National Historical Park, San Francisco, CA (African American Maritime History)
Selma to Montgomery National Historic Trail, Montgomery, Lowndes & Dallas Counties, AL
Timucuan Ecological and Historic Preserve, Jacksonville, FL (Kingsley Plantation)
Tuskegee Airman National Historic Site, Tuskegee, AL
Tuskegee Institute National Historic Site, Tuskegee, AL
Virgin Islands National Park, St.Johns, VI.

See also
 Canada
African-Canadian Heritage Tour
List of black Canadians
North American Black Historical Museum
Slavery in Canada
 United States
 African American Historic Places
 African Americans in France
 Buffalo Soldier
 General
 African diaspora
 Black people
 List of topics related to Black and African people

References

Bibliography
Savage, Beth L. (Ed.) African American Historic Places, National Register of Historic Places National Park Service, Preservation Press, 1994

External links 

NPS African American Heritage – Places of Struggle, Community and Triumph
African American Heritage – NPS Cultural Resources
 African American Sites – NPS

African-American historic places
National Historic Sites of the United States
National Park Service